This is a list of films produced by the Tollywood (Bengali language film industry) based in Kolkata in 2013.

January–March

April–June

July–September

October–December

References

2013
Lists of 2013 films by country or language
Bengali